Chrysallida carpinei is a species of sea snail, a marine gastropod mollusk in the family Pyramidellidae, the pyrams and their allies. The species is one of multiple species within the Chrysallida genus of gastropods.

Distribution
This species occurs in the following locations:
 Cape Verde

References

External links
 To Encyclopedia of Life
 To World Register of Marine Species

carpinei
Gastropods described in 2000
Gastropods of Cape Verde